is a Japanese politician who served in the House of Representatives of Japan.

Biography
Born in Maizuru, Ohara joined the Japan Maritime Self-Defense Force after graduating from high school, and graduated from Kwansei Gakuin University in 1999. She earned a master's degree from Kyoto University in 2007.

In 2009, she was elected to the House of Representatives as a Liberal Democratic Party representative of Kyoto 5th district. On June 26, 2012, during a vote on social security and integrated tax reform legislation, she was one of eleven representatives who urged Prime Minister Yoshihiko Noda to vote against the opposing Democratic Party representatives.

In 2015, she was elected to the Kyoto Prefectural Assembly for Maizuru; she is the assembly's first female member to represent that constituency. In 2019, she placed second place in the election with 0,836, with Masayoshi Ikeda ahead of her.

References

1974 births
Living people
Members of the House of Representatives (Japan)
Female members of the House of Representatives (Japan)
Kyoto University alumni
Kwansei Gakuin University alumni
Members of the Kyoto Prefectural Assembly
21st-century Japanese politicians
21st-century Japanese women politicians
People from Maizuru